Minister of Civil Aviation can refer to:

 Ministry of Civil Aviation (India)
 Secretary of State for Transport, the British position called the Minister of Civil Aviation from 1941 to 1959